Welagedara Stadium is a multi-use stadium that has hosted international and local cricket matches and other events in Kurunegala, Sri Lanka. The stadium can hold at least 10,000 spectators. It has regularly hosted international tour matches, unofficial test matches and U19 one-day games.

The stadium is beside the Kurunegala-Dambulla Road, Kurunegala, 95 km away from the capital, Colombo. The giant Elephant Rock nearby provides a dramatic backdrop.

Further information
Although the stadium was officially declared open by the then Minister of Home Affairs, Justice Felix Dias Bandaranaike in 1972, its history dates back to the British colonial period. It hosted its first international level match (as Welagedara Stadium) when a Sri Lanka Colts XI played the touring Pakistanis in February 1986.

Some games of the 2000 Under-19 Cricket World Cup and the 2008 Women's Asia Cup were held at Welagedara Stadium. Several international List A matches, U-19 games and Unofficial Test matches and many club cricket games have played at the stadium since the 1980s. The Battle of the Rocks is a match with a long history that is regularly played there between Maliyadeva College and St. Anne's College, Kurunegala, and a match called the Battle of the Greens is held there between Royal College Wayamba, Kurunegala, and Sir John Kothalawala College. Notable international cricketers such as Rangana Herath, Lanka de Silva and Eric Upashantha have played at the stadium in their younger days.

Gallery

External links

 Welagedara Stadium at Cricinfo

Cricket grounds in Sri Lanka
1972 establishments in Sri Lanka
Buildings and structures in Kurunegala District